"Sold Out of Flagpoles" is a song written and originally recorded by Johnny Cash for his 1976 studio album One Piece at a Time.

Released as  single from the album, the song reached number 29 on U.S. Billboard country chart for the week of August 28, 1976. The B-side contained the song "Mountain Lady" from the same album.

Content 
It is a story song.

Track listing

Charts

References

External links 
 "Sold Out of Flagpoles" on the Johnny Cash official website

Johnny Cash songs
1976 songs
1976 singles
Songs written by Johnny Cash
Columbia Records singles